The Three is a 2020 Russian drama film directed by Anna Melikian. It premiered at the Patriki Film Festival and was theatrically released in Russia on December 3, 2020.

Plot 
The film is about a married TV show host who receives an award and meets a new love, causing him to suffer and doom those he loves to suffering.

Cast

References

External links 
 

2020 films
2020 drama films
2020s Russian-language films
Russian drama films